Abubakar Adamu Mohamed  (born 15 October 1997) is a Nigerian professional footballer who plays as a goalkeeper for Wikki Tourists F.C.

References
 
 
 grenadafa.com

External links
 
 Amapakabo Unveils Final 23-Man Squad For U-23 AFCON 2019
 U23 Afcon: Watford’s Dele-Bashiru and FSV Mainz’s Awoniyi lead Nigeria squad | Goal.com
 Nigeria 0-1 Cote d'Ivoire: Olympic Eagles begin U23 Afcon title defence on a losing note
 

1997 births
Living people
Nigerian footballers
Association football goalkeepers